John Lewis Englehardt III (born May 23, 1987) is an American fiction writer and educator. His debut novel is Bloomland.

Life and career 
Englehardt earned a BA in creative writing from Seattle University and a MFA from the University of Arkansas. Englehardt taught English composition and creative writing classes at the University of Arkansas while completing his MFA. After completing his MFA, Englehardt worked as a contributing editor at Pacifica Literary Review, and was selected as a 2015 Made at Hugo House Fellow. 

His debut novel Bloomland was published by Dzanc Books in 2019. His writing has appeared in Sycamore Review, The Stranger, Vol. 1 Brooklyn, Monkeybicycle, and The Seattle Review of Books, among other publications. Englehardt currently teaches writing classes at Hugo House, a Seattle-based non-profit writing center.

Critical reception
Kirkus Reviews describes Bloomland as "Hugely important, hauntingly brutal" and states, "Englehardt has just announced himself as one of America’s most talented emerging writers." Kristen Millares Young of The Washington Post writes, "“Bloomland” juxtaposes the proximate with the predator, intermingling their perspectives until the flickering becomes a bloody tapestry of our beleaguered nation." In The Literary Review, Jeff Bursey states, "writing a relatively non-polemical debut novel about a student who shoots others at his campus would be difficult to do, but John Englehardt, in Bloomland, has achieved this feat." Publishers Weekly describes the novel as "potent" and states, "Englehardt’s debut poses timely, difficult questions."

Honors and awards
 2012 A&P Winter Fiction Contest, The Stranger 
 2014 Wabash Prize for Fiction, Sycamore Review
 2018 Dzanc Books Prize for Fiction
 2020 VCU Cabell First Novelist Award

Works
 Englehardt, John. (Dec. 5, 2012). "Gingrich". The Stranger
 Englehardt, John. (Dec. 16, 2013). "Kentbrook! Kentbrook! Kentbrook!" Monkey Bicycle
 Englehardt, John. (Jul. 8, 2018) "From the Void I Saw Your Face" Vol. 1 Brooklyn

Personal life 
Englehardt married his partner, Katharine Toombs, in March 2017. He currently resides in Seattle.

References 

1987 births
Living people
American writers
People from Fort Hood, Texas
Seattle University alumni
University of Arkansas alumni
Writers from Seattle